Amonovula is a monotypic genus of marine gastropod molluscs in the family Ovulidae, the ovulids, cowry allies or false cowries

Species
 Amonovula pirieiis the only species in the genus.

Distribution
It is found in the western Pacific Ocean, living in association with a gorgonian; its colour varies so that it matches the colouring of its host gorgonian.

References

 Fehse D. (2019). Contributions to the knowledge of the Ovulidae, XXVII. New generic assignment for Primovula piriei Petuch, 1973 (Mollusca: Gastropoda). Conchylia. 50(1-4): 33-38.

Ovulidae
Monotypic gastropod genera
Molluscs of the Pacific Ocean